Kunu (also known as kununzaki) is a popular drink consumed throughout Nigeria, mostly in the North. It is usually made from a grain such as millet or sorghum, although it can be made from maize as well. As a grain based beverage Kunu is a member of the Horchata family. The variety of the drink made from sorghum is a milky light-brown colour, whilst that which is made from millet and maize is whitish in colour.

Kunu is made by first allowing the grain seeds to germinate, then soaking the seeds in water for a few days and blending the soaked grain with sweet potatoes and ginger or pepper to form a smooth paste. This paste is then divided into two parts. One part is placed in a vessel and has boiling water poured on it, then it is stirred to give a thick mixture. The other part of the paste is then added to this mixture and it is stirred some more. The mixture is then left for a day or two for the grain husk to settle. After this, the husk and other sediment are filtered out of the mixture, and the filtered liquid is bottled for consumption.
This type of kunu is normally referred to as "kunu zaki" the one containing sugar.

KUNU AYA
HOW TO MAKE KUNU AYA (TIGER NUT DRINK)

Ingredients:

• 2 cups of Tiger Nuts (Dried or Fresh)

• 1 medium Ginger

• 10 Dates (Or less)

• 1 Coconut (Crack the shell and extract the flesh for blending)

Directions:

Step 1:
Soak the tiger nuts in clean water Overnight (if you are using the dry tigernuts)

Step 2:
Rinse the soaked tigernuts and place in a blender.
- Remove the seeds from the dates, wash and place in the blender.
- Peel and pour your diced coconut in the blender as well then add the skinned ginger, a little water or the coconut water and blend smooth.

Step 3:
With a Pap/Cheese cloth, strain the milk into a bowl. 
-The first milk strained would be thick then you place the chaff back into the blender, add some more water, blend & strain again until the whole milk is extracted. 
(Don't make the kunu aya too light for a better taste)

Step 4:
Place the extracted milk drink in a refrigerator to chill up.

Step 5:
Serve cold😊

Kunu tsamiya
This is specifically made from tsamiya and is also use as drink in hausa communities during naming, marriage and any other types of coronations.

Kunu, can be made from "Aya", "Gero", "Dawa" and "Gyada". It's normal made for sales or serves in many Nigerians traditional ceremonies especially in the northern and north central part of Nigeria.

References

Sources

External links
 Innovations in the Traditional Kunun Zaki Production Process

Nigerian cuisine
Plant milk